Muñoz, officially the Science City of Muñoz (Ilocano: Siudad ti Siensia ti Muñoz), is a 4th class component city in the province of Nueva Ecija, Philippines. According to the 2020 census, it has a population of 84,308 people.

Due to its rich topography and tropical climate, it is now home to agricultural research and technology centers, committed to the production of information and technological breakthroughs to promote rural development, productivity and food security.

From its lowly origins as “Sitio Papaya”, it was renamed as Muñoz in 1886 in honor of Spanish Governor Don Francisco Muñoz. It was in 1913, under Executive Order No. 72, when Muñoz was declared as a new and independent municipality. By the virtue of Republic Act 8977 signed on November 7, 2000, Muñoz formally elevated to a city and country's only city with "Science" in its formal name.

Etymology
The town got its name in honor of Don Francisco Muñoz, being the alcalde mayor and gobernadorcillo. 

The Science City title was because of the presence of many state universities and colleges in the city, alongside many technological, vocational and industrial structures sprung up in the city.

History

From Sitio to Barrio
In 1886, Papaya was changed into 'Muñoz' to honor Don Francisco Muñoz, the province's alcalde mayor, and the community's first appointed gobernadorcillo. Muñoz was annexed as a barrio of San Juan de Guimba municipality. Settlers trickled in from Bulacan and the Ilocos Region. In 1911, Factoria (now San Isidro town), the provincial capital, was totally flooded. Muñoz was then considered a possible new capital of the province.

At about the same time, the people of Barrios Muñoz and San Antonio, also in San Juan de Guimba town, and Palusapis in Santo Domingo municipality, together with Sitios Kabisukulan, Rang-ayan, Mataas na Lupa, Siniguelas, Purok Agrikultura, and Pulong Maragul in Talavera town, were organizing themselves to be separated from their three respective municipalities to become a new independent municipality. They were prepared to construct a municipal hall and a school building for the emerging town.

From Barrio to town and Science City

On the recommendation of the Provincial Board of Nueva Ecija, then headed by Governor Isauro Gabaldon, and with approval of then Acting Governor General Newton Gilbert, the organized barrios and sitios were granted independence as a regular municipality on January 10, 1913, under the name of Muñoz. The seat of the fledgling municipal government was positioned in erstwhile Barrio Muñoz. The municipality of Muñoz was born and steadily grew to become an agricultural Science City in the making.

A municipal hall, a church, and a small public market were erected in Lumang Bayan (now Poblacion North). A road linking the young Muñoz town with the national highway from Barangay Bacal, Talavera was constructed. In World War II, Muñoz was the last stronghold of the Japanese Imperial Army; the Allied liberation in Muñoz by the joint United States and Philippine Commonwealth forces offensive razed the town to the ground in a matter of days.

Cityhood

In 2000, after achieving cityhood status, universities and scientific research institutes sprung up. The local government used and, after ratified, adopted the Science city status.

Geography

Barangays
Science City of Muñoz is politically subdivided into 37 barangays.

The National Government has an ongoing move to transfer the Talavera barangays of Matingkis (Talavera), Bakal 1, Bakal 2 and Bakal 3 to become part of Science City of Munoz for the reason that the said barangays are geographically and strategically within the said city. This was favored by most of the residents of the said barangays but opposed by the Municipal Government of Talavera.

Also there is a proposed separation of Villa Pinili (Bantug West) and San Juan (CLSU) which will include PNR (CLSU), and Sawmill (CLSU) from Barangay Bantug into two independent separate barangay.

Climate

Demographics

Religion
Churches:
Sacred Heart of Jesus Shrine
San Sebastian parish Church
Christ the Worker Parish Church
Iglesia ni Cristo
Christian Churches
IIJMS Temples
United Pentecostal Church
The Apostolic Faith Church (Mission of Portland Oregon Inc.)
Jesus Christ the Living God Fellowship (Conservative Baptist)
Munoz Christian Church (FIFCOP) 
Lakas Angkan Ministry
Muñoz Church of Christ

Economy 

There are many new establishments in Munoz in the past few years. Notable are Jollibee Munoz, Mang Inasal Munoz, 7/11, BDO, Land Bank, Novo, Lucky 99, Friendship Supermarket, Inc (FSi), and the Villa-Mendoza Training Institute, are now major landmarks on the city.

Robinson, Save More and Pure Gold has also initially identified locations in the city for future construction.

With a bustling market center with rice trading as a major economic activity, it has transformed into its present status as a Science City by virtue of Republic Act 8977 on December 9, 2000. Being a science city, Muñoz was acknowledged as one of the members of League of Cities of the Philippines and became a pilot city of achieving the United Nation's Millennium Development Goals.

Research and development centers
The Philippine Rice Research Institute (PhilRice) (formerly the Maligaya Rice Research and Training Center (MRRTC)) is found in Muñoz
Central Office and National Genepool of the Philippine Carabao Center (PCC). 
National Freshwater and Fisheries Training and Research Center (NFFTRC)
The main offices of the Bureau of Postharvest Research and Extension (BPRE) now known as Philippine Center for Postharvest Development and Mechanization (PhilMech) 
Bureau of Fisheries and Aquatic Resources (BFAR-NFFTC) are also based in Muñoz.

Transportation
As with most towns in Central Luzon, inter-city transport is through the Pan-Philippine Highway (also known as Maharlika Highway/ Asian Highway 26), the country's principal transport backbone. The principal mode of transport is through Jeepneys with fixed routes, or through tricycles, whom you need to tell where to go.

Buses from Cagayan Valley to Manila and vice versa stops here.

From Manila, you can ride a public bus going to San Jose City, Nueva Ecija or take the North Luzon Expressway (NLEX) and Subic-Clark-Tarlac Expressway (SCTEX) and take La Paz Exit. And continue until reaching the city. You can also ride a public bus plying Cagayan Valley which exits at TPLEX (Tarlac–Pangasinan–La Union Expressway) Pura Exit; they continue to traverse through N114 (Pangasinan–Nueva Ecija Road) up to Baloc, Santo Domingo; and they turn left going to AH26 until you reach Muñoz.

Land use

Education
Central Luzon State University: is a state university on a 658-hectare campus in Science City of Muñoz, Nueva Ecija, Philippines. It is the lead agency of the Muñoz Science Community and the seat of the Regional Research and Development Center in Central Luzon. To date, CLSU is one of the premier institutions of agriculture in Southeast Asia and known for its breakthrough researches in aquatic culture (pioneer in the sex reversal of tilapia), ruminant, crops, orchard, and water management researches. https://clsu.edu.ph/

References

External links

 
 [ Philippine Standard Geographic Code]
Philippine Census Information
Local Governance Performance Management System

 
Cities in Nueva Ecija
Populated places established in 1913
1913 establishments in the Philippines
Component cities in the Philippines